Gerard Gustaaf Muller (20 January 1861 – 26 March 1929) was a Dutch Impressionist painter associated with the Tachtigers literary movement. His later works show elements of Orientalism.

Biography 
His father, Johan Werner Anton Muller, was a ship owner. From 1880 to 1884, he studied at the Rijksakademie with August Allebé. While there, Hendrik introduced him and his friends, Jacobus van Looy and Jan Veth, to a group called "Flanor", precursor of the Tachtiger (Eighties) movement.

From 1884 to 1888, he studied at the Royal Academy of Fine Arts in Antwerp with Charles Verlat. In 1887, he took second place for the Willink van Collenprijs. The following year, he returned to Amsterdam and took up residence at a house near the Oosterpark which would also be home to George Breitner and  Isaac Israëls, among others.

At this time, he created mostly watercolors of city scenes with figures. Later, he made several long trips; to Spain (1900), Italy (1913) and Morocco (1920). His work gradually came to show an obvious southern influence and many had Orientalist features.

In early 1918, he held an exhibition at the showroom of the "Maatschappij Panorama" and made the acquaintance of Louis Couperus, who held a lecture there in February; a meeting that received positive notice in the Algemeen Handelsblad. He and Couperus would become regular correspondents after that.

For many years, he was a member of Arti et Amicitiae; serving as its secretary and, later, as treasurer. In 1889, he married Jenny Juliette "Jetje" Roos (1865-1957), a comic actress.

Selected paintings

References

External links 

1861 births
1929 deaths
19th-century Dutch painters
Dutch male painters
20th-century Dutch painters
Dutch Impressionist painters
Dutch watercolourists
Orientalist painters
Painters from Amsterdam
19th-century Dutch male artists
20th-century Dutch male artists